Emmanuel Bonaventure Dennis (born 15 November 1997) is a Nigerian professional footballer who plays as a striker for Premier League club Nottingham Forest and the Nigeria national team.

Club career

Early career
Dennis began his career at Kwara Football Academy Ilorin, located in Kwara State, Nigeria.

Zorya Luhansk
In March 2016, Dennis signed with Ukrainian Premier League club Zorya Luhansk. He made his debut in a game against Olimpik Donetsk on 24 July 2016, where he scored the opener in a 3–0 victory.

Dennis started the season on the bench mostly before being given his UEFA Europa League debut to Feyenoord on 3 November, which ended 1–1. After impressing against Feyenoord, he also played in the Ukrainian side's other group stage games, to Fenerbahçe and Manchester United. Zorya lost 2–0 in both matches and were eliminated from the group having finished in last place.

On 11 December, Dennis scored his second goal in a 2–0 win over Stal Kamianske. His performances attracted both Manchester City as well as an unknown Bundesliga side, who were interested in signing him in the winter transfer window. However, Dennis instead ended up staying with Zorya for the rest of the season, helping them to a third place in the league with his six goals in 22 league appearances.

Club Brugge
Club Brugge announced on 30 May 2017 that they had signed Dennis on a four-year-deal for a fee of €1.2 million. He was given the number 42 jersey shirt. Dennis started the season extremely well, scoring five goals in six matches, including one on his debut on 26 July 2017 to İstanbul Başakşehir, a 3–3 draw and a brace three days later in the league over Lokeren, which finished in a 4–0 victory.

On 1 October 2019, Dennis scored twice in a 2–2 draw at the Santiago Bernabéu Stadium against Real Madrid in the group stage of the 2019–20 UEFA Champions League season.

1. FC Köln
On 25 January 2021, Bundesliga side 1. FC Köln announced that they had signed Dennis on a loan deal until the end of the season. He made a total of nine league appearances during his time in Germany.

Watford
On 21 June 2021, Watford confirmed they had reached an agreement with Club Brugge for the transfer of Dennis. A five-year contract was signed two days later. On 14 August, Dennis scored on his Watford debut in their league opener against Aston Villa, where Watford won 3–2. Dennis was nominated for the Premier League Player of the Month award for November 2021 after scoring and grabbing two assists in a 4–1 thrashing of Manchester United and scoring in a 4–2 defeat at Leicester City.

Nottingham Forest
On 13 August 2022, Dennis signed with Premier League side Nottingham Forest for an undisclosed transfer fee. Chief scout Tom Burton from Hucknall, highly rated the Nigerian international.

International career
Dennis represented Nigeria at under-23 level before being called up to the senior team. He made his debut on 10 September 2019 in a 2–2 friendly draw to Ukraine, coming on as a 82nd-minute substitute for Samuel Chukwueze.

The Nigeria Football Federation attempted to call Dennis up to the squad for the 2021 Africa Cup of Nations however accused Watford of refusing to release Dennis and 'baring their fangs'. Dennis was part of the Nigerian squad that lost on away goals with an aggregate score-line of 1–1 to the Black Stars of Ghana in the third round  of the 2022 FIFA World Cup qualifying.

Career statistics

Club

International

Scores and results list Nigeria's goal tally first.

Honours
Club Brugge
Belgian First Division A: 2017–18, 2019–20

References

External links
Profile at the Nottingham Forest F.C. website

1997 births
Living people
Association football forwards
Nigerian footballers
Nigeria international footballers
Ukrainian Premier League players
Belgian Pro League players
Bundesliga players
Premier League players
FC Zorya Luhansk players
Club Brugge KV players
1. FC Köln players
Watford F.C. players
Nottingham Forest F.C. players
Nigerian expatriate footballers
Expatriate footballers in Ukraine
Nigerian expatriate sportspeople in Ukraine
Expatriate footballers in Belgium
Nigerian expatriate sportspeople in Belgium
Expatriate footballers in Germany
Nigerian expatriate sportspeople in Germany
Expatriate footballers in England
Nigerian expatriate sportspeople in England
English Football League players